Ribes cynosbati is a North American species of shrub in the family Grossulariaceae (gooseberries and currants). It is native to the eastern and central United States and Canada. It has several common names, including prickly gooseberry, eastern prickly gooseberry, dogberry, and dog bramble. It grows in rich forests, rocky slopes, and open heaths from New Brunswick south along the Appalachian Mountains to northern Alabama and west as far as Manitoba, the Dakotas and Oklahoma.

Description
The leaves have 3 or 5 lobes, with glandular hairs. The flowers are greenish-white. The round fruits are bristly, white to greenish, and pleasant-tasting.

References

cynosbati
Flora of the United States
Flora of Canada
Plants described in 1753
Taxa named by Carl Linnaeus